Moweaqua is a village in Shelby and Christian counties, Illinois, United States. The population was 1,764 at the 2020 census.

Geography

Demographics

As of the 2020 census there were 1,764 people, 877 households, and 598 families residing in the village. The racial makeup of the village was 95.92% White, 0.91% African American, 0.34% Native American, 0.40% Asian, 0.34% from other races, and 2.10% from two or more races. Hispanic or Latino of any race were 1.36% of the population.

There were 877 households, out of which 64.99% had children under the age of 18 living with them, 52.11% were married couples living together, 8.44% had a female householder with no husband present, and 31.81% were non-families. 25.66% of all households were made up of individuals, and 13.57% had someone living alone who was 65 years of age or older. The average household size was 3.01 and the average family size was 2.46.

The village's age distribution consisted of 26.7% under the age of 18, 6.9% from 18 to 24, 24.8% from 25 to 44, 22.1% from 45 to 64, and 19.3% who were 65 years of age or older. The median age was 36.9 years. For every 100 females, there were 96.4 males. For every 100 females age 18 and over, there were 84.5 males.

The median income for a household in the village was $61,250, and the median income for a family was $76,000. Males had a median income of $48,882 versus $25,294 for females. The per capita income for the village was $26,487. About 10.2% of families and 10.4% of the population were below the poverty line, including 7.6% of those under age 18 and 7.5% of those age 65 or over.

Education

Moweaqua is served by the Central A&M School District, which was established in 1993, and also includes the city of Assumption as well as the nearby rural areas.  Central A&M High School (grades 9-12) and Gregory Intermediate School (3-5) are located in one building on the northern edge of Moweaqua.  The high school enrollment is approximately 300 students, and their teams are known as the Raiders. The Girls' Varsity Basketball team went to the state competition in 2008 and won third place. The Central A&M FFA Chapter is also a successful chapter in section, district and State FFA Events, as well as community service activities.

History

Moweaqua was named after a small stream 1.5 miles south of the station, called by the Indians Moweaqua, a Pottawatamie word that means "she that weeps".
From 1891 until 1935, Moweaqua was the site of a gassy coal mine that mined coal from Pennsylvanian strata.  On the morning of December 24, 1932, fifty-four coal miners, the entire day shift, were killed by a methane gas explosion in the Moweaqua coal mine disaster.  The incident occurred on the morning of Christmas Eve, and one of the deceased miners, Tom Jackson, had been scheduled to play Santa Claus in a party to be held that evening for his fellow townspeople.  The tragic explosion, together with the election in the previous month (November 1932) of the pro-labor Seventy-Third Congress, led to the passage of mine safety legislation and the phaseout of open-flame carbide miner's lanterns in United States coal mines.  The Moweaqua Coal Mine Museum opened in 1986 to commemorate local coal miners, especially the victims of this disaster.

The 2009 movie "The Informant" starring Matt Damon was partially filmed in Moweaqua.  The plot of the movie is based on the ADM price fixing scandal which occurred during the 1990s.  The scandal centered on ADM Vice President Mark Whitacre who lived in Moweaqua during the time.  Filming reportedly took place at the former Whitacre residence as well as the local restaurant now known as "The Salty Farmer" which Whitacre frequented while living there. The former Whitacre residence, located approximately 1 mile west of the Moweaqua city limits, was originally owned by the step-grandfather of former ABC president James E. Duffy. Mr. Duffy lived there for a time during his boyhood, and his time there, and his formative relationship with his step-grandfather, was documented in his 1997 autobiography, "Stay Tuned."

Notable people 

 Cecil Coombs, outfielder for the Chicago White Sox

References

External links
 Official Site - Moweaqua.org
 Mining More in Moweaqua 1889-1940

Villages in Shelby County, Illinois
Villages in Christian County, Illinois
Villages in Illinois